Cadbury Buttons are flat, circular, button-shaped chocolate pieces in small packs that were first sold by Cadbury in the United Kingdom in 1960. They are sold in Australia, New Zealand, Canada, Ireland and the UK. They are available in Cadbury's Dairy Milk and white chocolate. Giant versions of the buttons have also been produced. They are known for their circular design and feature animated animals on their packaging with their eyes being two buttons.

See also

 List of chocolate bar brands

References

External links 
 Cadbury UK - Buttons

British confectionery
Buttons
Mondelez International brands